Erotic sexual denial is the practice of refraining from sexual experiences in order to increase erotic arousal and/or tension. It is commonly used as sex play within the context of a dominance and submission relationship, though it can also be a solo practice. The prohibited experience can be narrowly or broadly defined and banned for a specific or indeterminate length of time, depending on the practitioner. The experience withheld can be any favored or desired sexual activities, such as specific acts or positions, provided it is something the practitioner wants.

Orgasm control practices like edging are well-known varieties of erotic sexual denial in which a person is kept in a heightened state of sexual arousal for an extended length of time without orgasm. Edging often ends with a delayed orgasm, unlike the similar practice of orgasm denial which typically does not lead to orgasm. Chastity devices such as penile chastity cages, cock harnesses or chastity belts can be used as a physical barrier to reduce or deprive an individual of genital stimulation. Another frequently mentioned variety is the use of dice or other games of chance by couples to determine how long a person is to be withheld oral and/or penetrative sex, etc., from their partner.  Erotic sexual denial is commonly, but not exclusively, practiced in association with BDSM and sexual bondage.

Denial practices

Tie and tease
Bondage techniques are commonly used to restrain the person being sexually denied, allowing them to experience their powerlessness more intensely. This practice is typically called "tie and tease" and can be thought of as extended tease and denial games. This practice is often an integral part of sexual denial. In discussions between BDSM partners, negotiation usually focuses on the activities which may or may not be agreed to. Tie and tease activities are physically as well as psychologically intense, because the strong feelings of sexual frustration are escalated by the sensation of helplessness induced by bondage.

Tease and denial

Tease and denial is a situation where a person is stimulated until they are close to orgasm, then stimulation is stopped, keeping the person on the brink of orgasm. It is sometimes referred to as "edging". This is similar to orgasm control, but without the promise of orgasm at the end.

If orgasm still occurs after removal of stimulation, it typically brings less pleasure than usual, and is considered a "ruined orgasm", as opposed to being a "denied orgasm" (which can sometimes lead to "blue balls" for both men and women). Alternatively (for men), the release of semen during the emission phase of ejaculation might be prevented by some sort of constriction ("blocked orgasm"). Depending on the relationship, subjects might be repeatedly teased to the point of orgasm several times, but without actual orgasm, causing feelings of intense arousal and psychological need.

Total denial 
The practice of total sexual denial usually includes total avoidance of genital stimulation to the penis or vulva. This often involves the use of a physical barrier or device, such as a chastity belt or cage. Chastity belts or similar locking devices are available for all genders. Depending on the situation, sexual arousal may still be possible regardless of physical barriers to genital stimulation. This, however, depends on the belt used.

Male strap-on harness 
A strap-on dildo may be worn by a male to still allow penetrative vaginal sex to the female while denying the male partner the ability to orgasm, and the male then may also wear a chastity device. This is distinct from pegging, as the strap-on in this case replaces the penis of the male. This can be seen as a form of total denial if the strap-on replaces the penis throughout the whole duration of the play, or as a form of teasing if the strap-on is only used during foreplay. In the last case, the strap-on can be used to prolong penetrative sex and thus sexually satisfy the female partner in case the male suffers from premature ejaculation.

As a form of control
Erotic sexual denial is sometimes used by a dominant to increase their control over a submissive. Because the submissive is kept in a state of sexual need and vulnerability, they are more likely to take a compliant stance with the dominant; failure to comply can result in additional teasing or an extended period of denial, among other punishments.

Orgasm denial practices can allow the dominant to exercise control over many aspects of the submissive's life. As such, they are often (though not always) practiced as an extension or enhancement of a broader BDSM relationship, or as a means of establishing one. They can allow the dominant to experience enjoyable and sometimes intensely craved feelings of sexual control and erotic power, and the submissive can enjoy intense feelings of sexual objectification and submission to the dominant.

Orgasm denial can also be used to increase a submissive's tolerance for physical stimulation, as training in holding back an orgasm, or to allow the submissive to orgasm on command; as a way to maintain a heightened state of sexual arousal in the submissive, or as a means of erotic humiliation desired by either the submissive or the dominant.

Erotic humiliation can also help enforce the dominant's position in the relationship. Orgasm denial is often accompanied by other forms of erotic humiliation such as forcing the submissive to do chores, crossdress, or consume bodily fluids. These can be used as punishments, as conditions for release, or simply at the discretion of the dominant.

See also

Chastity piercing
Coitus reservatus
Delayed ejaculation
Forced feminization
Forced orgasm
Erotic humiliation
Eroto-comatose lucidity – a form of erotic sexual denial

References

Further reading
 Georgia Ivey Green, A KeyHolder's Handbook, Georgia Ivey Green, 2013
 Georgia Ivey Green, Ultimate Guide to Tease and Denial, CreateSpace Independent Publishing Platform, 2015
 Ken Addison, Around Her Finger, Venus, 2004
 Lucy Fairbourne, Male Chastity: A Guide for Keyholders, Velluminous Press, 2015
 Elise Sutton, Female Domination, LULU, 2003
 Barbara Wright Abernathy, Venus on Top, Oakhill Press, 2010
 Georgeann Cross, Sexual Power for Women, Georgeann Cross, 1997

BDSM terminology
Orgasm
Sexual abstinence